Darracott may refer to:

People
Joseph Darracott (1934–1998), British writer
Terry Darracott (born 1950), English footballer
Henry Young Darracott Scott (1822–1883), English military officer
E. Darracott Vaughan (1939–2016), American urologist and professor

Locations
Darracott, Mississippi, United States
Stone-Darracott House, in  Dublin, New Hampshire, United States